was the second kumicho, or Godfather, of the Yamaguchi-gumi yakuza gang in Japan.

He assumed control of the gang in 1925 from his father, the gang's founder, Harukichi Yamaguchi.  He ruled until 1942, and was succeeded in 1946 by his protégé, Kazuo Taoka.

1902 births
1942 deaths
Yamaguchi-gumi
Yakuza members
Japanese crime bosses
People from Kobe